Giuseppe Guarino (15 November 1922 – 17 April 2020) was an Italian law scholar and politician from the Christian Democracy (DC). He served as the minister of finance briefly in 1987 and minister of industry and minister of state holdings from 1992 and 1993.

Early life and education
Guarino was born in Naples on 15 November 1922. His family were originally from Solofra. His father died when Giuseppe was just eleven years old.

Guarino studied law and specialized in public law.

Career
Guarino started his career as a faculty member at the University of Sassari in 1950 and became a professor of public law there. He also taught public law at the University of Siena. From 1967 to 1987 he was the governor of the Bank of Italy. He was elected to the Chamber of Deputies on the list of the DC. In 1987 he was appointed minister of finance to the Fanfani cabinet and in 1992 he was named minister of industry and minister of state holdings to the cabinet led by Prime Minister Giuliano Amato.

Work, views and death
Guarino was the author of various books and articles. He was a devout Catholic. Although he had a pro-European position previously, he later criticized the evolution of the European Union. He argued that in 1999 there occurred an "obscure coup d’État" referring to the approval of an EC Regulation numbered 1466–973.

He died in Rome on 17 April 2020 at age 97.

References

External links

20th-century Italian politicians
20th-century scholars
21st-century scholars
1922 births
2020 deaths
Finance ministers of Italy
Government ministers of Italy
Italian Roman Catholics
Politicians from Naples
Academic staff of the University of Sassari
Academic staff of the University of Siena
Christian Democracy (Italy) politicians
Governors of the Bank of Italy